Presidential elections were held in Colombia on 1 May 1938. Eduardo Santos of the Liberal Party was the only candidate after the Conservative Party decided not to contest the elections, and received 100% of the vote. Voter turnout was only 30.2%. Santos took office on 7 August.

Results

References

Presidential elections in Colombia
1938 in Colombia
Colombia
Single-candidate elections